Capua repentina is a species of moth of the family Tortricidae. It is found in Shanxi, China.

References

Moths described in 1978
Capua (moth)